The 1999 Brasil Open doubles was the tennis doubles event of the first edition of the most prestigious tournament in Brazil. Argentinian team Laura Montalvo and Paola Suárez won the title, in what was the team's second title of the year, defeating Janette Husárová and Florencia Labat in the final.

Seeds

Draw

Qualifying

Seeds
  Mariana Mesa /  Romina Ottoboni (Qualifiers)
  Mariana Díaz Oliva /  Milagros Sequera (qualifying competition)

Qualifiers
  Mariana Mesa /  Romina Ottoboni

Qualifying draw

References
 ITF doubles results page
 Main Draw (WTA)

Doubles